Soha Hassoun is American computer scientist. She is Professor (since 2015) and Past Chair (2013–2016) of the Department of Computer Science at Tufts University. Hassoun's interests lie at the intersection of machine learning and systems biology.

Biography 
Hassoun earned her BSEE degree from the South Dakota State University (1986), MS from the Massachusetts Institute of Technology (1988), and PhD from the Department of Computer Science and Engineering, University of Washington (1997).

In 1988–1991 Hassoun was an integrated circuit designer with the Microprocessor Design Group, Digital Equipment Corporation. She worked as consultant for IKOS Systems (now part of Mentor Graphics) (1999–2001) and some other EDA companies. Since 1998 she has been with Tufts University.

Awards and recognition
2016: Marie R. Pistilli Women in Engineering Achievement Award
2015: IEEE CEDA (Council on Electronic Design Automation) Distinguished Service Award for chairing the Design Automation Conference
2000, 2007: ACM/SIGDA Distinguished Service Award
2002: ACM/SIGDA  Technical Leadership Award
 Senior member of IEEE (2007) and ACM
2001–2006: NSF CAREER Award

References

Year of birth missing (living people)
Living people
American computer scientists
Tufts University faculty
South Dakota State University alumni
Massachusetts Institute of Technology alumni
University of Washington College of Engineering alumni
Electronic engineering award winners
American women computer scientists
21st-century American women